"Jamming" is a song by the reggae band Bob Marley and the Wailers from their 1977 album Exodus. The song also appears on the compilation album Legend. The song was re-released 10 years later as a tribute to Bob Marley and was again a hit, as in the Netherlands, where it was classified in the charts for 4 weeks. In Jamaican patois the word jamming refers to a getting together or celebration. It is still receiving moderate airplay from adult alternative stations.

Bob Marley's wife Rita Marley has performed the song during the tribute concert "Marley Magic: Live In Central Park At Summerstage". Marley's children Ziggy Marley and the Melody Makers have performed the song during their concerts. Their live version of the song appears on the concert CD/DVDs Live Vol. 1 and Ziggy Marley and the Melody Makers Live.  Notably, the song contains the line, "No bullet can stop us now".  On December 3, 1976, Marley was shot by unknown gunmen who had broken into his home, and recovered shortly afterwards.

Charts

Weekly charts

Original version

with MC Lyte

Certifications

In popular culture 

 The song was sung at the end of The Simpsons episode "The Canine Mutiny" sung by Chief Wiggum.
 The song was used in the Season 8 episode of The Middle titled "Roadkill."
 The song is played in the movie Captain Ron, along with many other Bob Marley songs.
 The song is sung during the honeymoon in Along Came Polly.
 The song was adapted for a Vodafone commercial called Roaming instead of Jamming, promoting the operator's roaming service.
 The song was spoofed as "Diggin'" on an episode of Bill Nye the Science Guy centered on archaeology.
 The song is played live in a nightclub in the Miami Vice episode titled Cool Runnin' (1984).
 Sometimes used by ABC during coverage of NBA games.

See also 
 Master Blaster (Jammin'), a Stevie Wonder song intended as an ode to Bob Marley (particularly inspired by "Jamming").

References

External links
 

1977 songs
1977 singles
2000 singles
Bob Marley songs
Songs written by Bob Marley
Island Records singles